The 2011 AFL season was the 15th season contested by the Port Adelaide Football Club, and was Matthew Primus's first full year as senior coach of the club.

Domenic Cassisi was confirmed to retain the captaincy for the 2011 season as part of a seven-man leadership group.

They also became the first team to lose to expansion club  after Port's Justin Westhoff missed a kick after the siren that would have won the game for Port Adelaide. Port narrowly avoided last place on the ladder and the wooden spoon with their final round win over Melbourne, which lifted them above  on the ladder.

2011 squad

2011 results

Pre-season

NAB Cup

Group stages

NAB Challenge

First round

Second round

Third round

Home and Away season

Round 1

Round 2

Round 3

Round 4

Round 5

Round 6

Round 7

Round 8

Round 9

Round 10

Round 11

Round 12

Round 13

Round 14

Round 15

Round 16

Round 17

Round 18

Round 19

Round 20

Round 21

Round 22

Round 23

Round 24

Ladder

Leading Goalkickers

Awards and milestones
Source

References

Port Adelaide Football Club
Port Adelaide Football Club seasons